Andrew Lindsay is a British rower, later business entrepreneur, CEO of Telecom Plus.

Andrew Lindsay may also refer to:

Andrew Lindsay (archer) (born 1976), New Zealand archer
Andrew Lindsay (swimmer) (born 1979), British Paralympic swimmer
Andrew Lindsay (rugby union) (1885–1970), Scotland international rugby union player
Andrew Lindsay (musician), musician, member of Fenech-Soler
Andrew Lindsay, musician with the Canadian band The Saddletramps (1980s until 1995)
Andrew Lindsay, musician, guitar player with Scottish indie pop band Reverieme
Lord Andrew Lindsay, a Cambridge student runner, a character in the 1981 British film Chariots of Fire played by Nigel Havers

See also 

Andrew Lindsay Lewis, known as Drew Lewis, American businessman and former Secretary of Transportation